Notre Dame of Jolo College is private school run by Missionary Oblates of Mary Immaculate in Jolo, Sulu, Philippines, founded on June 14, 1954 by Bishop Francis McSorley, OMI. in order to bring educational benefits to the people of Sulu Province. The founders were particularly interested in training teachers who would bring advantages of good education at the grassroots level in all the far-flung islands of Sulu. Notre Dame of Jolo College is a member of Notre Dame Educational Association Philippines.

Other Notre Dame Schools in the Philippines 
 Notre Dame of Greater Manila 
 Notre Dame of Midsayap College (NDMC)
 Notre Dame University - Cotabato City (NDU)
 Notre Dame of Dadiangas University (NDDU)
 Notre Dame of Kidapawan College (NDKC)
 Notre Dame of Marbel University (NDMU)
 Notre Dame of Tacurong College (NDTC)

References

Marist Brothers schools
Catholic universities and colleges in the Philippines
Catholic elementary schools in the Philippines
Catholic secondary schools in the Philippines
Universities and colleges in Sulu
Educational institutions established in 1952
Notre Dame Educational Association
1952 establishments in the Philippines